Hatra District is a district of Nineveh Governorate, Iraq.

History 

On January 22, 2022, three ISIL suspects died in an airstrike by Iraqi authorities after the 2022 Diyala massacre. Two of them were ISIL leaders. 

On February 8, 2022, the Iraqi Armed Forces launched an airstrike near Hatra city against the Islamic State, killing seven ISIL members.

References 

Districts of Nineveh Governorate